Politehnica University of Timișoara (abbreviated UPT) is a public university in Timișoara. Founded in 1920, it is one of the largest technical universities in Central and Eastern Europe. The 10 faculties of the university provide study programs for about 13,000 students. In 2011, Politehnica University of Timișoara was classified as an advanced research and education university by the Ministry of Education. The university is a founding member of the Romanian Alliance of Technical Universities (ARUT).

History

1920–1948: Polytechnic School 
The idea of establishing a polytechnic school in Timișoara appeared since the beginning of the 20th century, the Austro-Hungarian Empire wanting both the industrial development of Banat and offering a reason for satisfaction to the majority Romanian population. Following the proposal of the City Council meeting of 26 November 1906, in 1907 mayor Carol Telbisz submitted a memorandum to the Ministry of Public Instruction in Budapest on the need for a polytechnic school. But the Minister of Instruction's proposal to the Budapest Parliament in 1911 was rejected. However, the ministry delegates a commission consisting of the rector of the Budapest Polytechnic and nine professors to deal with the issue together with the Timișoara City Hall. Proceedings resumed in 1916, but were blocked by World War I. However, on 23 November 1917, the City Hall decided to cede an 8-hectare plot of land on the left bank of the Bega for the Polytechnic buildings and to arrange the building of a school or a barracks for the temporary operation of the school. The Governing Council decides to establish the Polytechnic on 27 February 1920, and according to the Official Gazette no. 3191 of 22 October 1920, the Council of Ministers approves the establishment starting with 15 November 1920, allocating one million lei. The decree, with no. 44822, is countersigned by King Ferdinand on 11 November.

At first, as the school did not have its own headquarters, it functioned with a secretariat within the City Hall. This is where the first registrations for the candidates and their verification took place. In the first year, the Polytechnic School started its activity with a number of 117 students from all Romanian provinces: 89 enrolled in the first year and 28 in the preparatory year. Courses begin on 29 November 1920. The teaching staff consisted of rector Traian Lalescu (who taught mathematical analysis), Constantin Teodorescu (strength of materials and theoretical mechanics),  (descriptive geometry), Constantin Cândea (chemistry) and Augustin Coman (mathematics). Traian Lalescu's name is related to the establishment of the prestigious publication Revista matematică din Timișoara (15 March 1921), the Yearbook of the Polytechnic School, the Student Circle and the Student Sports Association ("Politehnica"). The courses were held in the premises of a primary school on Carol Telbisz Street, a place still in the patrimony of the Polytechnic. In 1923, the construction of pavilions began on Michael the Brave Boulevard, which groups the laboratories, museums and other rooms of the Polytechnic. King Ferdinand also took part in the inauguration of the pavilions on 11 November 1923, stating:

1948–1991: Polytechnic Institute 
In 1948, the Polytechnic School changed its name to the Polytechnic Institute and comprised four faculties (Mechanics, Electrotechnics, Constructions and Chemistry) with 12 specialization sections.

The Computer Center was established in 1961. This was the core of the future IT industry in the area. Also here was built MECIPT-1, the first electronic computer built in a university in Romania and the second in the country after CIFA-1 from the Institute of Atomic Physics in Măgurele. The computer was used both in the teaching process and for the calculations needed for projects such as the Vidraru Dam and the RomExpo. The creators of MECIPT-1, Wilhelm Löwenfeld and Iosif Kaufmann, were decorated by the country's president in 2003 with the highest civil order – the Star of Romania in the rank of Knight – for their contribution to the development of computer technology in Romania. At the initiative of Horia Gligor and Dan Bedros, the MECIPT-1 computer was exhibited in a section of the Museum of Banat, in 2001, and along the way it was restored. Currently, MECIPT-1 has returned to the Politehnica University, being the central piece of the UPT Museum, along with other exhibits that highlight the pioneering role of Timișoara's Polytechnic in the development of computer technology in Romania.

The half-centenary of the institute was celebrated in 1970, on which occasion it was granted the right to bear the name of Traian Vuia Polytechnic Institute. The institute comprised five faculties with 24 specialization departments for engineers and sub-engineers, 537 teachers and 5,653 students. In 1974, according to the State Council Decree no. 147, the sub-engineering institutes from Hunedoara and Reșița became subordinated to the Traian Vuia Polytechnic Institute.

1991–present: Politehnica University 
In 1991, based on the Order of the Minister of Education and Science no. 4894, the Traian Vuia Polytechnic Institute was renamed the Technical University of Timișoara. Four years later, by Government Decision no. 568, it became the Polytechnic University of Timișoara.

Faculties

Infrastructure

Dormitories 
Politehnica University manages a number of 16 student dormitories, of which 14 are located in the Student Complex and two are located in the perimeter of the Faculty of Mechanics. As of 2017, the accommodation capacity of the dormitories is about 6,000 places.

Hotels 
The university has two hotels in the city center, the Polytechnic House 1 (17 rooms) and the Polytechnic House 2 (31 rooms), both equipped at a three-star level and with their own restaurant.

Canteens 
On the student campus, the university has two canteens: the student canteen and the 1MV fast food. Cafés also exist in many of the university buildings.

Central Library 

The library was also founded in 1920, together with the Polytechnic School. The activity of the library was started in the building of the primary school on Carol Telbisz Street, where it was active until 1947, when its collections were moved to the headquarters on Piatra Craiului Street. Since November 2014, the library has a new headquarters at 2B Vasile Pârvan Boulevard. With about one million volumes in its inventory, the library has a daily traffic of over 1,000 users (exceeding even 2,000 users per day during exam sessions).

Sports facilities 

Politehnica University has many sports facilities, including two sports bases with two indoor halls equipped for ball games, two standard football pitches for competitions, a football dome with synthetic grass, six tennis courts with floodlight, two handball courts, a complex of swimming pools, fitness rooms and facilities for many other sports games. Sports base 1 comprises an athletics track, indoor mini-football pitches, a football pitch and a gym, while sports base 2 has swimming pools, a sports hall, tennis courts, basketball courts and football pitches, among others.

Construction on a new 2,560-seat polyvalent hall began in 2010. The new arena will be used for basketball, volleyball, handball, tennis and other sports, but will also become a venue for various events and concerts.

Mobility and international cooperation 
The most part of the outgoing and incoming mobility is developed within the frame of the Erasmus Programme, currently Erasmus+. Besides Erasmus+, other mobility programmes are running or are expected to be implemented in UPT, based on bilateral agreements with foreign universities or on various mobility programmes and financial mechanisms, like EEA, CEEPUS, AUF and DAAD mobility schemes.

The university has more than 300 Erasmus+ agreements and over 100 framework cooperation agreements with universities in Europe, Asia, Africa, North America and South America. Every year more than 200 students carry out a study or internship mobility abroad, while more than 100 students from partner universities come to study or practice under the coordination of UPT teachers.

Internationally, the university is affiliated with:

 Association for Computing Machinery (ACM)
 Association for Smart Learning Ecosystem and Regional Development (ASLERD)
 Agence universitaire de la Francophonie (AUF)
 European Association for Architectural Education (EAAE)
 European Association for International Education (EAIE)
 European Distance and E-learning Network (EDEN)
 European University Association (EUA)
 Fédération internationale du béton (FIB)
 Institute of Electrical and Electronics Engineers (IEEE)

Rectors

Notable faculty 

  (1893–1975), engineer
 Constantin Avram (1911–1987), engineer
  (1905–1960), engineer
 Constantin Dinculescu (1898–1990), engineer
  (1907–1977), chemist
 Caius Iacob (1912–1992), mathematician
 Traian Lalescu (1882–1929), mathematician
  (1887–1963), engineer
 Ilie Murgulescu (1902–1991), chemist
  (1901–1967), engineer
 Remus Răduleț (1904–1984), engineer
 Victor Vâlcovici (1885–1970), mathematician
  (1889–1967), architect and engineer
 Ioan Vlădea (1907–1976), engineer

See also 
 List of modern universities in Europe (1801–1945)

References 

 
Timișoara, Politehnica
Timișoara, Politehnica
Educational institutions established in 1920
1920 establishments in Romania